Michalis Papakonstantinou (1 November 1919 – 17 January 2010) was a Greek politician and author. He studied law at the Aristotle University of Thessaloniki.  Papakonstantinou served as the Minister for Foreign Affairs from 7 August 1992 until 13 October 1993, as a member of the New Democracy Party.

He regularly wrote as a columnist in newspapers in both Athens and Thessaloniki. He also contributed to Greek and foreign magazines as a writer.

Papakonstantinou was born in Kozani, Greece, in 1919. He died on January 17, 2010, at the age of 90.

References

1919 births
2010 deaths
Foreign ministers of Greece
Greek columnists
Greek writers
New Democracy (Greece) politicians
People from Kozani